Tranent Parish Church is a kirk belonging to the Church of Scotland.

History

The present church at Tranent was built by John Simpson and opened in 1800, as what is believed to be at least the third church in the town. Local legend has it that a chapel dedicated to St. Martin of Tours and was associated with Lindisfarne in the 8th century. The town's original Brythonic name, Travernant, meaning "settlement on the ridge overlooking a ravine", tends to show there was a settlement there in the 8th century.  The first known mention of a church at Tranent came in 1145 when it was established by the archdeacon, Thor, son of a local landowner. The church was granted by Richard, Archbishop of St Andrews and later confirmed by Saer de Quincy, the local baron. Tranent parish came under the jurisdiction of the canons of Holyrood Abbey and the building was described as being of a higher standard than the normal country church. Although a settlement grew around the church by 1251, it remained in the hands of Holyrood. There are also canonical records of a chapel, dedicated to St. Peter, situated on a ridge overlooking a coal-bearing ravine at Travernant.

The church was badly damaged in 1544 and 1547, each time by the forces of the Earl of Hertford during the Rough Wooing. Tranent Parish Church joined the Scottish Reformation when Thomas Cranstoun, the first minister took over from the evicted canons and the last Roman Catholic priest, Thomas Moffat; the church of St. Peter was now a reformed Protestant church. The church remained a ruinous condition, after Somerset's attack, into the 17th century and, though it was refurbished, it is not known when. The church was said to have been restored, extended and improved throughout, but in 1799 the decision was made to build a new church which was opened in 1800, a church which still stands high above the ravine overlooking the Firth of Forth. At a total cost of over 10,000 pounds, the church was extensively refurbished and refurnished in 1954. The congregation had to meet in the town hall during the work, but the church they returned to is much the same as it is today. The church is a category B listed building.

Parish Ministers
Rev John Sharp 1561 - 1562
Rev Thomas Cranston 1562 - 1568
Rev Alexander Forrester 1568 - 1597
Rev James Gibson 1598 - 1602

Rev Robert Wallace 1603 - 1617

Rev Robert Balconquel 1618 - 1651 (1st Ministry)

Rev Walter Balconquel 1651 - 1658

Rev Thomas Kirkcaldie 1658 - 1662

Rev Robert Balconquel 1662 - 1666 (2nd Ministry)

Rev Andrew Barclay 1666 - 1671

Rev William Meldrum 1671 - 1672

Rev James Craig 1676 - 1681

Rev James Gartshore 1683 - 1687

Interregnum

Rev John Mutter 1700 - 1739
 
Rev Charles Cunningham 1740 - 1783

Rev Hugh Cunningham 1783 - 1801

Rev Andrew Brown 1801 - 1805

Rev John Henderson 1805 - 1850

Rev Robert Stewart 1850 - 1851

Rev Dr William Caesar 1852 - 1912

Rev Andrew Hewat 1912 - 1942

Rev Dr James Bulloch 1942 - 1953

Rev Alexander Miller 1953 - 1983

Rev Thomas Hogg 1984 - 2007

Rev Jan Gilles 2008 - 2014

Rev Erica Wishart Dec 2015 - Sept 2020

Rev Katherine Taylor Oct 2021–Present

Worship
There is a service every Sunday morning at 11:00am in the church (except on Remembrance Sunday when it is 11:30am, the service is preceded by a public service at the war memorial at around 10:45am – 11:20am).

Children usually stay in church for the first half of Sunday services and are then invited to go upstairs for 'J Club' - which offers age-appropriate activities linked to that day's Bible reading. If young children find it hard to settle, they can sit in the gathering area where the adult with them can still see and hear the service - the children are provided with activities to keep them occupied. A creche is also available.

After every Sunday service tea/coffee and biscuits are served in the gathering area. This is a good opportunity to socialise and get to know each other.

The second Sunday of each month is an all-age worship in the church.

Communion services are held at 11am on:
• 1st Sunday in March
• 1st Sunday in June
• 1st Sunday in September
• 1st Sunday in Advent

Kirkyard
The kirkyard contains many fine gravestones, including the remains of the Caddell family of Cockenzie. It is the burial place of Colonel James Gardiner who died at the Battle of Prestonpans (1745), which took place in the shadow of Tranent Parish Church and within sight of his own home at Bankton House. The yard also contains one of the oldest lectern-type doocots (dovecote) in Scotland, dated 1587.

References

External links
More photos of Tranent

Churches in East Lothian
Category B listed buildings in East Lothian
Listed churches in Scotland
Tranent